Raymond Cazallis Davis (June 23, 1836 – June 10, 1919) was the chief librarian at the University of Michigan for 28 years. He was the first to offer a course at a college in bibliography.

Early life 
Davis was born in Cushing, Maine, on June 23, 1836. His parents were George Davis and Catherine (Young) Davis. His father is of English and Welsh ancestry and his mother of Scotch and Irish. Davis's father was a sea captain. In 1849 when Davis was 13 years old his mother died. His father then took him on a two-year world tour.

Career 

After returning from his world adventures Davis prepared for college in 1852 at New Hampton, New Hampshire. In 1855 he became a student at the University of Michigan in Ann Arbor, Michigan. After two years at the university he became seriously ill. Because of his illness he was not able to continue his studies or take employment. He regained his health and got a job around 1860 in short sea shipping in Maine. He stayed there for a few years.

In 1868 Davis returned to the University of Michigan and got a part-time position as an assistant librarian through 1872. At that time then he returned to Maine and was employed in local shipping. In 1877 he was offered the chief librarian position at the University of Michigan, which he accepted. Davis started offering in 1878 the first course at a college in bibliography, which he taught once a week during November and December.

Davis married Ellen Regal, the daughter of pastor Eli Regal, on July 6, 1880. He received an honorary degree of Master of Arts in 1881 from the University of Michigan. He was a key motivating force in the construction of the university's first library building, which opened in 1883. Through his efforts the library grew in size and became an instrumental part of the university.

Later life and death 

Davis again became seriously ill and was forced into semi-retirement in 1905 after 28 years as a librarian at the University of Michigan. However, he did continue to lecture on bibliography part-time into 1914, until his illness forced him to quit altogether. He died on June 10, 1919, at Ann Arbor.

Works 

 Reminiscences of a Voyage around the World (1869), based on his boyhood experiences.

References

Sources 

1836 births
1919 deaths
People from Knox County, Maine
University of Michigan alumni
University of Michigan staff
American librarians
Writers from Maine
Writers from Michigan
American people of British descent